Gulf States Toyota, founded in 1969, is a private distributor of Toyota vehicles in the United States. They are franchised by Toyota Motor Sales, USA to sell vehicles to car dealerships in the five states of Arkansas, Louisiana, Mississippi, Oklahoma, and Texas. Corporate headquarters is located within the Houston Energy Corridor on a  campus with a five and ten-story building beside an eight-story parking garage.

History
During the 1960s, one of Thomas H. Friedkin's hobbies was racing cars. He was friends with Carroll Shelby, famous for designing the AC Cobra and the Shelby Mustang. Shelby had turned down an offer to become a distributor for Toyota because Lee Iacocca told Shelby that "the domestic makers were going to push the Japanese back into the ocean". Shelby introduced Friedkin to Toyota, and Friedkin entered into an agreement to distribute Toyota vehicles from the Port of Houston. Gulf States Toyota Distributors (GST) was founded in 1969
when all Toyota vehicles were manufactured in Japan and imported into the US. Three years later, the company employed 35 associates and had sold 5,000 cars and trucks through 14 dealerships.
In 1979, GST had the highest import car, truck and combined import sales in the United States with 65,826 vehicles sold.

Operations
Gulf States Toyota is the smaller of just two private distributors of Toyota vehicles in the United States. The other is Southeast Toyota Distributors in Jacksonville, Florida, founded by the late Jim Moran. Dealerships in the remaining areas in the United States are supplied by Toyota Motor Sales, USA. 

Toyota Motor Sales opened seven manufacturing facilities in the US since 1984 and today, the majority of vehicles distributed by GST arrive by Rail transport.

New Rail Site
GST signed an economic development agreement with Temple, Texas in 2008 to construct a $50-million Inland Processing facility. The city is located between Houston and Dallas. GST was granted a 300-acre tract as an incentive to locate there. Construction was expected to begin in July 2009 and be completed by December 2011. However, the Financial crisis of 2007–2008 and 2009–2011 Toyota vehicle recalls caused Gulf States and Temple to adopt an amendment to the agreement in 2010. GST was allowed to postpone construction for up to five years while compensating the city for infrastructure improvements already made: $4.6 million over three years. The project was never resumed.
 
Hurricane Harvey inflicted severe damage on the company's headquarters in August of 2017, causing staff to relocate for several months while repairs were made.

In 2019, GST celebrated their 50th year in business. They have been consistently ranked as the #1 or #2 privately held company in Houston by the Houston Chronicle since 2010, and have also been in the top 100 on Forbes' list of America's Largest Private Companies.

Leadership
Toby Hynes served as president and general manager at GST from 1999 to 2012.
Martin "Marty" Collins, formerly a marketing executive for Ford Motor Company, was hired after Hynes retired. Ford filed a lawsuit in Detroit, claiming that Collins violated his employment contract by working for a competitor and sharing proprietary information.  Collin's attorney responded that Collins was employed by the Friedkin Group, an investment company which owns GST. The suit was eventually dropped.
Collins quit abruptly in 2017 and was replaced by Jeff Parent, a Senior VP who remains in that position as of early 2022.

Vehicle processing center
Vehicle Processing is located at 1602 Wooded Pine Drive in Houston. It includes an industrial spur with 7-sidings to offload vehicles from Rail cars. Vehicles are prepped, accessorized, assigned to dealerships and loaded onto Car carrier trailers for transport to the dealerships. Window tinting is one option that the processing center does quickly and efficiently. All vehicles destined for Texas receive the required state inspection before leaving the center.
The small percentage of vehicles that are not produced domestically arrive by ship at the Port of Long Beach.

Parts
Gulf States Toyota completed construction and opened its  Parts Distribution Center (PDC) near Sealy, Texas in 1986. The $11 million project created a shipping dock on the north side of the facility to separate shipping and receiving operations. Manuel Sanchez, director of the parts distribution center stated, "that will allow us to process, ship and manage more orders at the same time, providing faster service to dealerships.” The warehouse handles 55,000 different parts/accessories and ships over $1 million in sales each day.

GSFSGroup
Gulf States finance & services group provides dealer support tools.

Training
Training is available to dealership employees in most facets of the auto business. In the service department, courses range from entry-level to advanced vehicle maintenance and repair education for Toyota vehicles using computerized diagnostic equipment and hybrid technology. Gulf States Technical Services department provides diagnostic assistance and advice to Toyota dealership technicians. Gulf States Toyota has two training centers: one is a  facility on their corporate campus in Houston; the other is located in Coppell, Texas, a suburb of Dallas.

Software
Gulf States dealership software includes systems for accounting, service, parts and warranty. Computer programs are available to provide summary data to management, helping to identify problems and take corrective action.

Products
Dealers can generate additional revenue by selling Vehicle Service Contracts, Maintenance Programs, GAP insurance, Tire & Wheel Service Contracts, Lease Protection, Limited Warranty & Credit Insurance along with the vehicle.

Employees
GSFSGroup can assist dealerships in recruiting, training & retaining personnel.

Community
Outreach efforts in the community include several programs.

Hurricane relief
After Hurricane Harvey in 2017, Toyota people from the US raised over $1.5 million for the Friedkin Disaster Relief Fund . GST parent Friedkin Group also donated $500,000 to the United Way of Greater Houston.

Stadiums
In September 2013, the soccer-specific stadium formerly known as Pizza Hut Park in Frisco, Texas was renamed Toyota Stadium. It is primarily used by Major League Soccer club FC Dallas (also sponsored by Gulf States Toyota) and Frisco Independent School District. 
GST also purchased naming rights to Toyota Field in San Antonio, home of minor league soccer team the Scorpions in 2013.

References

External links 
Gulf States Toyota website
The Friedkin Group website
GSFS Group webpage

Toyota
American companies established in 1969
Automotive companies established in 1969
Automotive companies of the United States
Companies based in Houston
Privately held companies based in Texas